The 2005–06 season was F.C. Motagua's 55th season in existence and the club's 40th consecutive season in the top fight of Honduran football.

Overview
After a disastrous first half of the season where the team finished last, in the Clausura tournament they were able to overcome and avoided relegation.

Squad

Results

Preseason and friendlies

Apertura

Clausura

References

External links
 Official website

F.C. Motagua seasons
Motagua
Motagua